Kotovsk may refer to:
Kotovsk, Russia, a town in Tambov Oblast, Russia
Kotovsk, from 1935 to 2016, name of Podilsk, a town in Ukraine
Kotovsk, from 1940 to 1990, name of Hîncești, a town in Moldova